In the mathematical field of functional analysis, the space bs consists of all infinite sequences (xi) of real numbers  or complex numbers  such that

is finite.  The set of such sequences forms a normed space with the vector space operations defined componentwise, and the norm given by

Furthermore, with respect to metric induced by this norm, bs is complete: it is a Banach space.

The space of all sequences  such that the series

is convergent (possibly conditionally) is denoted by cs.  This is a closed vector subspace of bs, and so is also a Banach space with the same norm.

The space bs is isometrically isomorphic to the Space of bounded sequences  via the mapping
 

Furthermore, the space of convergent sequences c is the image of cs under

See also

References 

 .

Banach spaces
Functional analysis